Emmanuelle in Soho is a 1981 British sex film directed by David Hughes and produced by David Sullivan, and starring Angie Quick (under the name 'Mandy Miller'), Julie Lee and John M. East. Sullivan had originally intended Mary Millington to star in the film.

The film tells the story of half-Chinese Kate Benson (played by Lee) and her photographer husband Paul (Kevin Fraser) who share their Bayswater home with a nymphomaniac stripper, Emmanuelle (played by Quick). The two women attempt to find work in the sex industry in London's Soho district, and get mixed up with a sleazy, and unscrupulous theatrical agent, Bill Anderson (played by East).

The film premiered in Sheffield and transferred to London where it ran for 10 weeks at the Eros cinema on Piccadilly Circus followed by 25 weeks at the Moulin in Great Windmill Street. There is also a hardcore versions of this film - such a version was released in Hong Kong cinemas where it ran for nearly three years. The US release included a 6-minute mini-documentary prologue about the sex industry in Soho.

Cast
 Angie Quick as Emmanuelle of Soho
 Julie Lee as Kate Benson
 John M. East as Bill Anderson
 Kevin Fraser as Paul Benson
 Gavin Clare as Mr. Cole
 Timothy Blackstone as Derek
 Geraldine Hooper as Jill
 Anita Desmarais as Sheila Burnette
 Georges Waser as Tom Poluski
 Erika Lea as Judy
 Kathy Green as Sammy
 Suzanne Richens as a Showgirl
 John Roach as Albert

Reception
Emmanuelle in Soho was one of the last British softcore films to receive a theatrical release before the abolition of the Eady Levy and the growth of home video led to the virtual disappearance of British low-budget exploitation film-making. In a contemporary review, the Monthly Film Bulletin described the film as "of marginal interest for its unabashed portrait of the neighbourhood's tawdry illicit wares". The review noted that the "slipshod scripting is about par for the course".

See also
Emmanuelle – 1974 pornographic French film
Pornography in the United Kingdom

References

Further reading
 Simon Sheridan Keeping the British End Up: Four Decades of Saucy Cinema 2011 (fourth edition) (Titan Publishing, London) 
 Simon Sheridan Come Play with Me: The Life and Films of Mary Millington 1999 (FAB Press, Guildford)
 Sweet, Matthew. Shepperton Babylon: The Lost Worlds of British Cinema. Faber and Faber, 2005.

External links

Julie Lee: Driven (The Grindhouse Effect)

1981 films
1980s sex comedy films
1980s English-language films
British sex comedy films
1981 comedy films
1980s British films